The Statute Law Revision Act 1878 (41 & 42 Vict c 79) is an Act of the Parliament of the United Kingdom.

This Act was repealed for the United Kingdom by Group 1 of Part IX of Schedule 1 to the Statute Law (Repeals) Act 1998.

This Act was retained for the Republic of Ireland by section 2(2)(a) of, and Part 4 of Schedule 1 to, the Statute Law Revision Act 2007.

Section 2 of this Act revived Acts repealed by the Statute Law Revision Act 1873 and the Statute Law Revision Act 1875. Section 3 of this Act amended the second of those Acts.

Sections 2 and 3 of, and the Schedules to, this Act, were repealed by section 1 of, and Schedule 1 to, the Statute Law Revision Act 1894 (57 & 58 Vict c 56).

See also
Statute Law Revision Act

References
Halsbury's Statutes,
The Public General Statutes passed in the forty-first & forty-second years of the reign of Her Majesty Queen Victoria, 1878. Queen's Printer. East Harding Street, London. 1878. Pages 651 to 661.

External links
List of amendments and repeals in the Republic of Ireland from the Irish Statute Book
  ["Note" and "Schedule" of the bill (unlike the schedule of the act as passed) gives commentary on each scheduled act, noting any earlier repeals and the reason for the new repeal]

United Kingdom Acts of Parliament 1878